Ornithomimoides ("bird mimic-like") is a dubious genus of theropod dinosaur, from the Late Cretaceous (Maastrichtian stage, sometime between 70 and 66 mya) Lameta Formation of India. Two species have been identified, the type species O. mobilis and O. barasimlensis, were named by von Huene in 1932 and were described by Matley in 1933 though they are known only from isolated vertebrae. O. barasimlensis is known from five dorsal vertebrae, and O. mobilis from four smaller vertebrae, found at the same location.

See also

 Timeline of ceratosaur research

References

Late Cretaceous dinosaurs
Dinosaurs of India and Madagascar
Ceratosaurs
Fossil taxa described in 1933
Taxa named by Friedrich von Huene
Taxa named by Charles Alfred Matley
Nomina dubia